Kim Lykkeskov (born 3 August 1983, in Vojens) is a Danish professional ice hockey player who participated at the 2010 IIHF World Championship as a member of the Denmark National men's ice hockey team.

References

External links

1983 births
Danish ice hockey forwards
Living people
SønderjyskE Ishockey players
Vojens IK players
People from Haderslev Municipality
Sportspeople from the Region of Southern Denmark